The Select Bipartisan Committee to Investigate the Preparation for and Response to Hurricane Katrina was the House of Representatives' congressional committee investigating the United States Government's failure to respond appropriately to Hurricane Katrina.

The committee was directed to cease 30 days after releasing its final report.  That report was released February 15, 2006.

Members
Despite the committee's name, it actually did not operate on a bipartisan basis. The committee was to have 20 members, with 11 members from the Republican majority and 9 members from the Democratic minority. However, Democrats did not appoint any members to the committee.

Final report
The final report, titled A Failure of Intitiave, found issues in the governmental response at all levels. It led to enactment of "Post-Katrina Emergency Reform Act", which was meant to rectify the mistakes made and lack of preparation in response to Katrina.

See also
 Criticism of the government response to Hurricane Katrina

External links
http://katrina.house.gov/

References

Hurricane Katrina House
Effects of Hurricane Katrina
Hurricane Katrina
United States national commissions